Bolzano Vicentino is a city and comune in the province of Vicenza, in the northern Italian region of Veneto. It lies east of the A31 highway, with a population of 5,455.

The main attraction is Palladio's Villa Valmarana Scagnolari Zen, situated in the frazione  Lisiera.

Sources 
 (Google Maps)

Cities and towns in Veneto